Bloom is an alternative music club founded on 16 May 1987 in Mezzago in Brianza and still active, which hosts mainly live concerts, but also film screenings arthouse either outdoors or in the dedicated room, music competitions, courses, exhibitions of art and photography.

It is run by the Social Cooperative "Il Visconte di Mezzago" aiming to "concretely demonstrate that it is possible to live in this society without surrendering neither to the logic of consumerism and corporations, nor to cultural atrophy." The Bloom has always led a constant and varied music programming at a rate of more than 100 concerts a year and theme days and is still a reference point for Lombard music lovers.

Some past concerts

References

External links 
 Official website

Nightclubs in Italy
Music venues in Italy